The Konda is a river in the Khanty–Mansia district of Russia. The town of Uray and the Shaimskoye oil field are along the Konda.

It is a left tributary of the Irtysh. The river has its sources on the western edge of the West Siberian Plain. The river is frozen over from late October to late April. Its main tributaries are from the left: Mulymya, Bolshoy Tap, Yukonda and Kama, and from the right: Yevra and Kuma. 

The Konda region, or Kondia, is one of the many provinces mentioned in the full official title of Russian tsars.

References

Rivers of Khanty-Mansi Autonomous Okrug